William Joseph Mackey, S.J. (19 August 1915 – 18 October 1995) was a Canadian Catholic priest and Jesuit educator. He was responsible for establishing the modern education system in Bhutan, including its first high school (which is now its first accredited university, Sherubtse College).

Early life
William Joseph Mackey was born on 19 August 1915 in Montreal, Quebec to Kitty Murphy, an Irish Catholic, and Herbert Mackey, a Protestant of Irish descent. He received a Catholic primary education and successfully applied for scholarship at Loyola College, which included a high school. He was accepted into the Society of Jesus shortly after graduating from high school and joined the St. Stanislaus Novitiate in Guelph, Ontario on 14 August 1932.

Mackey was ordained a priest on 15 August 1945 by Archbishop Joseph Charbonneau in the Immaculate Conception Church. He pronounced his final vows on 15 August 1949. In 1946, he left Canada for the Jesuit mission in Darjeeling district of India. He served there for 17 years, during which time he participated in many education programs and was headmaster of two high schools. However, he also became unpopular with local authorities, and in 1963 he was ordered to leave the country.

When the King of Bhutan, Jigme Dorji Wangchuck, learned of Mackey's imminent expulsion from India, he invited Mackey to become an educator in Bhutan, as part of that country's ongoing modernization efforts. Mackey accepted the invitation. As a preemptive measure, he had all his teeth removed, because he would have no access to modern dentistry in Bhutan.

Life in Bhutan

When Mackey arrived in Bhutan in October 1963, the Jesuits became the first Roman Catholic religious order allowed in the officially-Buddhist nation. During the three decades that followed, Mackey performed no conversions of Bhutanese citizens, as that was forbidden under Bhutanese law.

His first school, in Trashigang, was based in an abandoned cowshed and had 7 students.

In 1973, Mackey was awarded the royal Druk Thuksey medal for his services to education in Bhutan.

Mackey died on 18 October 1995, in a hospital in Thimphu, due to an infected gum which lead to blood poisoning. After his death in 1995, his obituary on Bhutanese national radio lasted 15 minutes.  Despite his wishes to be buried in Bhutan, the Darjeeling Jesuits claimed his body for burial in their own cemetery.

References

Citations

Sources

External links
Father Bill Mackey: Beloved Son of Bhutan, documentary. 
Documentary on Father Mackey on The Current (requires RealAudio)
"How It All Began", a brief history of the early days of the Bhutanese education system, including recollections from Father Mackey (requires Acrobat Reader)

1915 births
1995 deaths
Roman Catholic missionaries in Bhutan
Canadian Roman Catholic missionaries
Missionary educators
Canadian educators
20th-century Canadian Jesuits
Canadian expatriates in Bhutan
Clergy from Montreal
Deaths from sepsis
Roman Catholic missionaries in India
Canadian expatriates in India
Jesuit missionaries
Sherubtse College